Knox Township is one of the eighteen townships of Columbiana County, Ohio, United States. As of the 2010 census it had a population of 4,434.

Geography
Located in the northwestern corner of the county, it borders the following townships and city:
Smith Township, Mahoning County - north
Goshen Township, Mahoning County - northeast corner
Butler Township - east
Hanover Township - southeast corner
West Township - south
Paris Township, Stark County - southwest corner
Washington Township, Stark County - west
Alliance - northwest

Two unincorporated communities are located in Knox Township:
The unincorporated community of Homeworth, in the southwest
The unincorporated community of North Georgetown, in the west

Name and history

It is one of five Knox Townships statewide.
The township was organized in 1808.

Government
The township is governed by a three-member board of trustees, who are elected in November of odd-numbered years to a four-year term beginning on the following January 1. Two are elected in the year after the presidential election and one is elected in the year before it. There is also an elected township fiscal officer, who serves a four-year term beginning on April 1 of the year after the election, which is held in November of the year before the presidential election. Vacancies in the fiscal officership or on the board of trustees are filled by the remaining trustees.

Township Trustees
Matthew Johnson, Chairman
Gregory R. Carver, Vice Chairman
John Eddie Barnhart

Fiscal Officer
Debra S. Hartzell

References

External links
Township website
County website

Townships in Columbiana County, Ohio
1808 establishments in Ohio
Townships in Ohio